Gumby is a character made of green clay who was the star of the animated television series The Gumby Show.

Gumby may also refer to:

Gumby: The Movie, featuring the green character
Gumbys, recurring characters in the television series Monty Python's Flying Circus
Gumby (album), released in 1989
Kyle "Gumby" Gunther, the lead singer of Michigan heavy metal band Battlecross
L. S. Alexander Gumby (1885–1961), African-American archivist and historian
Jordan Montgomery, American baseball pitcher, nicknamed "Gumby".

See also
Survival suit, "quick don" versions being known as Gumby suits
The Old Gumbie Cat Jennyanydots, a character from Old Possum's Book of Practical Cats and the musical Cats
Gummy (disambiguation)